Ernő Schubert (June 4, 1881 in Budapest – February 10, 1931 in Budapest) was a Hungarian track and field athlete who competed at the 1900 Summer Olympics.

He participated in the 60 metres competition, in the 100 metres competition, and in the 200 metres competition. But in every event he was eliminated in the first round. In the long jump competition he finished ninth with a distance of 6.050 metres.

References

External links

1881 births
1931 deaths
Athletes from Budapest
Hungarian male sprinters
Hungarian male long jumpers
Athletes (track and field) at the 1900 Summer Olympics
Olympic athletes of Hungary